Faith Moves is a collaborative album by Nicky Skopelitis and Sonny Sharrock, released in 1991 through CMP Records.

Reception

Steve Huey, writing for AllMusic, stated: "These are frequently fascinating explorations that illuminate a neglected facet of Sharrock's singular style." In an article for The Washington Post, Geoffrey Himes commented: "There's plenty of tension in the duets -- especially when Sharrock adds barbed-wire to his tone and counterpoint to his harmonies -- but there is so much openness and melodicism in the arrangements to make this free jazz at its loveliest."

Track listing

Personnel 
Musicians
Sonny Sharrock – electric guitar
Nicky Skopelitis – electric guitar, acoustic guitar, bağlama, Coral sitar, tar, bass guitar, production
Production and additional personnel
Paul Berry – engineering
Martin Bisi – engineering
Bruce Calder – engineering
Jason Corsaro – mixing
Oz Fritz – engineering
Bill Laswell - production
Robert Musso – engineering
Howie Weinberg – mastering

References 

1991 albums
Albums produced by Bill Laswell
Collaborative albums
Sonny Sharrock albums
Nicky Skopelitis albums